Kenneth Clark (1903–1983) was an English art historian and television presenter.

Kenneth, Ken(ny) Clark or Kenneth Clarke may also refer to:

Sports

Gridiron football
 Kenny Clark (wide receiver) (born 1978), American football wide receiver
 Kenny Clark (defensive tackle) (born 1995), America football defensive tackle
 Ken Clark (punter) (1948–2021), CFL and NFL punter
 Ken Clark (running back) (1966–2013), former NFL running back
 Ken Clarke (American football) (born 1956), American football defensive tackle

Other sports
 Kenny Clark (referee) (born 1961), former Scottish referee
 Ken Clark (weightlifter) (born 1955), American Olympic weightlifter
 Ken Clarke (Australian footballer) (1883–1965), Australian rules footballer
 Kenneth Clarke (field hockey), Australian hockey player

Others
 Kenneth Clarke, Baron Clarke of Nottingham (born 1940), a British politician
 Kenneth Clark (psychologist) (1914–2005), African-American psychologist
 Kenneth Clark (ceramicist) (1922–2012), New Zealand-born British ceramicist
 Kenneth Clark (priest) (1922–2013), Archdeacon of Swindon
 Ken Clark (actor) (1927–2009), American actor
 Ken Clark (politician), American politician
 Kenneth Willis Clark (1898–1979), Greek palaeographer
 Ken Clarke (bishop) (born 1949), Irish Anglican bishop
 Kenny Clarke (1914–1985), American jazz drummer
 Kenneth A. Clarke, President and CEO of Pritzker Military Museum and Library in Chicago

See also
 Clarke (surname)